Frank Nuttall (born 4 May 1968 in Hamilton) is a Scottish UEFA Pro Licence Manager and Head Coach.

Playing career

Nuttall was a player at Celtic, playing in the reserve and youth teams, before studying at Cardiff Metropolitan University and Loughborough University to gain master's and bachelor's degree in sports science and physical education .

Coaching career

UK and Asia
At age 24, he started his career by coach educating for the Welsh FA and coaching their Under-14 and Under-15 sides.

In 1998, he became fitness coach of West Bromwich Albion FC and pursued his management and coaching career by studying to obtain the UEFA 'A' Licence and UEFA Pro Licence.

Rangers FC appointed him as fitness coach in 2004 and won the Scottish Premier League and Scottish League Cup in the 2004–05 season.

Later, he was assistant manager of Al-Nasr Dubai SC and thereafter, scouted for Middlesbrough. and joined their backroom staff as fitness coach in 2008.
 
Some years later, he was assistant coach for the China national team, attending the Asian Cup tournament in Qatar, and was 1st team coach at Qingdao.

Africa

Looking for a club in 2014, he eventually joined Gor Mahia, champions of the Kenyan Premier League; it would be the first time he would serve as a head coach.

Under his stewardship, he led the K'Ogalo to an unbeaten league title in 2015, an achievement not done in the competition since 1976. Adding to this, the Scot guided them to KPL Top 8 Cup and Kenyan Super Cup titles in 2015 besides winning the league in 2014 and 2015.  He also led them to the 2015 CECAFA Cup Final in Tanzania for the first time in 20 years.

As a result of his efforts, the former Rangers fitness coach was named 2015 SportPesa Coach of the Year.

He became Assistant Coach to Alex McLeish at Zamalek in 2016, after which Nuttall joined Ghanaian outfit Accra Hearts of Oak in 2017 as Head Coach and led them to their first appearance in the FA Cup Final in seventeen years and victory in the 60th Anniversary Independence Cup Final against their greatest rivals, Asante Kotoko.

Hearts of Oak started their preseason training ahead of the 2018 Ghanaian Premier League season without him in December 2017; he was sacked in February 2018 despite guiding them to a 3rd-place finish in the Ghana Premier League and the final of the FA Cup in the 2016/2017 season.

He was hired by Sudanese Premier League outfit El-Hilal El-Obeid in October 2018.

In January 2020, he was appointed Head Coach of Township Rollers in Botswana and led them to the Mascom Cup Final and 2nd in the Botswana Premier League before the season was postponed due the COVID pandemic.

In March 2021, Nuttall was appointed Manager of Ethiopian club Saint George, on a short contract until the end of the season.

Achievements and individual honours

Manager/Head Coach 
With over 180 matches as a Manager and Head Coach in 6 countries, Nuttall is unbeaten in 75% of matches with a 55% match win record and an average of 2 points per match.

Gor Mahia
Kenyan Premier League: 2014, 2015
Kenyan Super Cup: 2015
KPL Top 8 Cup: 2015

Individual
SportPesa Kenya Coach of the Year: 2015

Accra Hearts of Oak
Ghana Independence Cup 2017

Assistant Coach 
England U17
UEFA U-17 Championship: 2010

Rangers
Scottish Premier League: 2004–05
Scottish League Cup: 2004–05

Bristol City
Football League Trophy: 2003

References

External links

1969 births
Living people
Scottish footballers
Celtic F.C. players
Association football midfielders
Scottish football managers
Gor Mahia F.C. managers
Accra Hearts of Oak S.C. managers
Saint George S.C. managers
Ghana Premier League managers
Ethiopian Premier League managers
Scottish expatriate football managers
Expatriate football managers in the United Arab Emirates
Expatriate football managers in China
Expatriate football managers in Kenya
Expatriate football managers in Egypt
Expatriate football managers in Ghana
Expatriate football managers in Sudan
Expatriate football managers in Botswana
Expatriate football managers in Ethiopia
Scottish expatriate sportspeople in the United Arab Emirates
Scottish expatriate sportspeople in China
Scottish expatriate sportspeople in Kenya
Scottish expatriate sportspeople in Egypt
Scottish expatriate sportspeople in Ghana
Scottish expatriate sportspeople in Sudan
Scottish expatriate sportspeople in Botswana
British expatriate sportspeople in Ethiopia